Big Shanty is an unincorporated community in Lafayette Township, McKean County, Pennsylvania, United States.

References

Unincorporated communities in McKean County, Pennsylvania
Unincorporated communities in Pennsylvania